My Short Stories is the first B-side compilation album by the popular Japanese singer-songwriter Yui that was released on November 12, 2008. This album contains all the past B sides of her past singles and a new song titled "I'll be".

The album is certified platinum by RIAJ for shipment of 250,000 copies in Japan.

My Short Stories will be reissue in Blu-Spec CD format with limited press on September 2, 2009.

The album title, My Short Stories' message is "Zutto kono Arubamu wo tsukuritakute, sono monogatari wa, YUI kara hajimatta" (ずっと　このアルバムを　作りたくて、その物語は　YUIから　始まった) which means in English "I have always wanted to make this album. This short story is all started from YUI."

Track listing 
Normal Edition 

Limited Edition
Normal Edition + DVD

"I'll Be"
"I'll Be" was chosen for the commercial song of Sony Walkman NW-S638FK Series and its promotion campaign named, "Play You". Yui did a school live in Omiya Koryo High School in Saitama Prefecture, Japan with the orchestra of the school for this campaign. The footage of this event was released in her next single, Again Limited Edition. Later, "I'll be" was again released as an orchestra mix version. Yui filmed another commercial for Sony Walkman with this live event. This school live was aired on NTV program Dare Mo Shiranai Nakeru Uta (誰も知らない泣ける歌 Unknown songs that can make you cry) on 18 February 2009.  The message for this campaign is "Itsudatte tonari de utau yo. Ongaku ga areba hitotsu ni nareru ne" (いつだって となりで 歌うよ。 音楽が あれば 一つに 慣れる ね。) which mean in English "I will always sing next to you. If there is music, we can all become one."

Sales charts (Japan)

Oricon sales charts

References

Yui (singer) albums
B-side compilation albums
2008 compilation albums
2008 video albums
Music video compilation albums
Sony Music Entertainment Japan compilation albums
Japanese-language compilation albums